Countess of Strathearn may refer to:
 Any of the wives of the holders of the title Earl of Strathearn, currently Catherine, Princess of Wales (born 1982), wife of William, Prince of Wales
 Euphemia Stewart, Countess of Strathearn (b. before 1375 – d. 1434)
 Maria de Ergadia (d. 1302), Queen consort of Mann and the Isles